This is a list of issue covers of TV Guide magazine for the decade of the 1950s, from its national launch in April 1953 through December 1959.  The entries on this table include each cover's subjects and their artists (photographer or illustrator).  This list is for the regular weekly issues of TV Guide; any one-time-only special issues are not included. From April 3, 1953 to July 9, 1954, the magazine organized their TV listings from Friday to Thursday. Starting July 17, 1954, the pattern was reorganized in order from Saturday to Friday and would be done in this manner until April 3, 2004.

1953

1954

1955

1956

1957

1958

1959

Sources
Covers and table of contents page descriptions for the various issues.
TV Guide cover archive website: 1950s
TV Guide: Fifty Years of Television, New York, NY: Crown Publishers, 2002. 
Stephen Hofer, ed., TV Guide: The Official Collectors Guide, Braintree, Mass.: BangZoom Publishers, 2006.  .
"50 Greatest TV Guide Covers," article from the June 15, 2002 edition of TV Guide
Information from ellwanger.tv's TV Guide collection section

Covers
TV Guide covers
TV Guide
1950s television-related lists